Elvenes may refer to:

Places
Elvenes, Alta, a village in Alta municipality, Finnmark county, Norway
Elvenes, Finnmark, a village in Sør-Varanger municipality, Finnmark county, Norway
Elvenes, Nordland, a village in Øksnes municipality, Nordland county, Norway
Elvenes, Salangen, a village in Salangen municipality, Troms county, Norway
Elvenes, Troms, a village in Gratangen municipality, Troms county, Norway

People
Bjørn Elvenes (1944–1988), Norwegian ice hockey player
Hroar Elvenes (1932–2014), Norwegian former Olympic speed skater
Hårek Elvenes (born 1959), Norwegian politician for the Conservative Party